Robert Fulford may refer to:

 Robert Fulford (journalist) (born 1932),  Canadian journalist, magazine editor, and essayist
 Robert Fulford (croquet player) (born 1969), English croquet player
 Robert C. Fulford (1905–1997), American osteopath